Alexandru Coconul (14 August 1611 – 26 June 1632) was Hospodar and Voivode of Wallachia from 1623 to 1627 and Hospodar of Moldavia from 1629 to 1630. He was the son of Radu Mihnea, who also was a Hospodar. He married Ruxandra Beglitzi. He was the last of Vlad the Impaler's Romanian bloodline. He died on 26 June 1632 in Istanbul.

References

Bibliography 

Rulers of Moldavia
Rulers of Wallachia
1632 deaths
Year of birth unknown
Rulers of Moldavia and Wallachia
1611 births